Rodrigo Rodrigues Ribeiro (born 18 July 1978 in Itaboraí) is a retired Brazilian professional footballer who last played for Luxembourg club FC Jeunesse Canach as a central defender.

External links

1978 births
Living people
Sportspeople from Rio de Janeiro (state)
Brazilian footballers
Association football defenders
Associação Desportiva Cabofriense players
Liga Portugal 2 players
Segunda Divisão players
S.C. Pombal players
F.C. Barreirense players
Portimonense S.C. players
F.C. Vizela players
Cypriot First Division players
Doxa Katokopias FC players
Olympiakos Nicosia players
Nea Salamis Famagusta FC players
Brazilian expatriate footballers
Expatriate footballers in Portugal
Expatriate footballers in Cyprus
Expatriate footballers in Luxembourg
Brazilian expatriate sportspeople in Portugal
Brazilian expatriate sportspeople in Cyprus
Brazilian expatriate sportspeople in Luxembourg
People from Itaboraí